Gene Walker (June 7, 1893 – June 21, 1924) was an American motorcycle flat track racer who was one of the first riders from the Southern United States to become nationally known, winning 19 championships in a 10-year career that ended with his death at the peak of his success.

In 1910, Walker obtained his first motorcycle, an Excelsior.  At 17 he worked as a postal delivery person in Birmingham using an Indian motorcycle for delivering mail. Walker entered his first motorcycle race at the 1912 Alabama State Fair and won the five-mile final. In the same year he left his job at the post office to go to work for a Birmingham Indian dealer named Bob Stubbs.

In 1914 Walker turned professional and worked in the testing room at the Indian headquarters in Springfield, Massachusetts. Walker won 19 national championships in his 10 years of professional racing before he died in 1924. On June 7, while practicing alone on a track in Stroudsburg, Pennsylvania, Walker crashed. He died in Rosenkrans Hospital in East Stroudsburg, Pennsylvania, on June 21.

Walker was inducted to the Motorcycle Hall of Fame in 1998.

Major milestones

References

American motorcycle racers
1893 births
1924 deaths
Motorcycle land speed record people